Oberwiesenfeld is a station on the Munich U-Bahn which opened on October 28, 2007. It is located at the Moosacher Straße at the northern end of the Olympiapark, near the Olympic Village in Am Riesenfeld.

References

External links

Munich U-Bahn stations
Railway stations in Germany opened in 2007